Captain Charles Hamilton Sorley (19 May 1895 – 13 October 1915) was a British Army officer and Scottish war poet who fought in the First World War. He was killed in action during the Battle of Loos in October 1915.

Life and work
Born in Powis House Aberdeen, Scotland, he was the son of philosopher and University Professor William Ritchie Sorley.  He was educated at King's College School, Cambridge, and then like Siegfried Sassoon, at Marlborough College (1908–13). At Marlborough College Sorley's favourite pursuit was cross-country running in the rain, a theme evident in many of his pre-war poems, including Rain and The Song of the Ungirt Runners. In keeping with his strict Protestant upbringing, Sorley had strong views on right and wrong, and on two occasions volunteered to be punished for breaking school rules.

Before taking up a scholarship to study at University College, Oxford, Sorley spent a little more than six months in Germany from January to July 1914, three months of which were at Schwerin studying the language and local culture. Then he enrolled at the University of Jena, and studied there up to the outbreak of World War I.

After Germany declared war on Russia, Sorley was detained for an afternoon in Trier, but was released on the same day and told to leave the country. He returned to England and immediately volunteered for military service in the British Army. He joined the Suffolk Regiment as a second lieutenant and was posted to the 7th (Service) Battalion, a Kitchener's Army unit serving as part of the 35th Brigade of the 12th (Eastern) Division. He arrived on the Western Front in Boulogne, France on 30 May 1915 as a lieutenant, and served near Ploegsteert. He was promoted to captain in August 1915.

Sorley was killed in action near Hulluch, having been shot in the head by a sniper during the final offensive of the Battle of Loos on 13 October 1915. Having no known grave at war's end, he is commemorated on the CWGC Loos Memorial.

Sorley's last poem was recovered from his kit after his death, and includes some of his most famous lines:

When you see millions of the mouthless dead
Across your dreams in pale battalions go

Legacy
Marlborough and Other Poems was published posthumously in January 1916 and immediately became a critical success, with six editions printed that year. His Collected Letters, edited by his parents, were published in 1919.

Robert Graves, a contemporary of Sorley's, described him in his book Goodbye to All That as "one of the three poets of importance killed during the war". (The other two were Isaac Rosenberg and Wilfred Owen.) Sorley may be seen as a forerunner of Sassoon and Owen, and his unsentimental style stands in direct contrast to that of Rupert Brooke.

The last two stanzas of his poem Expectans expectavi were set to music in 1919 by Charles Wood; this anthem for choir and organ quickly established itself in the standard repertoire of Anglican cathedrals and collegiate churches.

Sorley is regarded by some, including the Poet Laureate John Masefield (1878–1967), as the greatest loss of all the poets killed during the war.

On 11 November 1985, Sorley was among 16 Great War poets commemorated on a slate stone unveiled in Westminster Abbey's Poet's Corner. The inscription on the stone was written by Wilfred Owen. It reads: "My subject is War, and the pity of War. The Poetry is in the pity."

It Is Easy To Be Dead by Neil McPherson, a play on his life, based on his poetry and letters, was presented at the Finborough Theatre, London, and subsequently at Trafalgar Studios, London, in 2016 where it was nominated for an Olivier Award. It subsequently toured to Glasgow and Sorley's birthplace, Aberdeen, in 2018.

On 9 November 2018, an opinion commentary by Aaron Schnoor published in The Wall Street Journal honored the poetry of World War I, including Sorley's poem "When You See Millions of the Mouthless Dead".

Works 
 Marlborough and Other Poems. Cambridge University Press, 1916.

 Wilson, Jean Moorcroft (Ed). The Collected Poems of Charles Hamilton Sorley. London: Cecil Woolf, 1985. .
 Wilson, Jean Moorcroft (Ed). The Collected Letters of Charles Hamilton Sorley. London: Cecil Woolf, 1990.
 Spear, Hilda D. (Ed). The Poems and Selected Letters of Charles Hamilton Sorley. Dundee: Blackness Press, 1978.

References

Further reading

 McPherson, Neil. It Is Easy To Be Dead. Oberon Books, 2016.
 Wilson, Jean Moorcroft (Ed). Charles Hamilton Sorley: A Biography. London: Cecil Woolf, 1985.
 Nail, Norbert (2017): Der schottische Dichter Charles Hamilton Sorley als Student im Sommer 1914 an Saale, Lahn und Mosel. (https://www.uni-marburg.de/de/uniarchiv/inhalte-pdf/der-schottische-dichter-charles-hamilton-sorley-als-student-im-sommer-1914-an-saale-lahn-und-mosel.pdf).

External links

 
 
 
 Selected Poetry of Charles Hamilton Sorley – Biography and 5 poems(All the Hills and Vales Along, Barbury Camp, Expectans Expectavi, The Song of the Ungirt Runners, To Germany, When You See Millions of the Mouthless Dead)
 Prose & Poetry – Charles Hamilton Sorley
 Portrait Chalk drawing by Cecil Jameson at National Portrait Gallery, London
 Charles Hamilton Sorley: 1914–15 in Letters (London Symphony Orchestra)

1895 births
1915 deaths
20th-century British male writers
Alumni of University College, Oxford
British Army personnel of World War I
British military personnel killed in World War I
People educated at Marlborough College
People from Aberdeen
Scottish male poets
Scottish World War I poets
Suffolk Regiment officers
Deaths by firearm in France
Military personnel from Aberdeen